Michael Roberts (born 1 June 1979) is a former professional rugby league footballer who last played for the Villeneuve Leopards in the Elite One Championship in France. He played for the  Brisbane Broncos in 2007 and trained with the full time squad in 2007 and 2008

Playing career
Roberts played his first first-grade game for the Brisbane Broncos in 2007 after playing most of his career at the Queensland Cup team Redcliffe Dolphins.  His position of choice was as a hooker.

Roberts played in 241 games for the Redcliffe Dolphins in the Queensland Cup. He scored 71 tries and a total of 552 points.

References

External links
Redcliffe Dolphins profile

1979 births
Living people
Australian rugby league players
Brisbane Broncos players
Redcliffe Dolphins players
Rugby league five-eighths
Rugby league halfbacks
Rugby league hookers
Rugby league players from Brisbane
Villeneuve Leopards players